Alfred William Burbury (31 January 1865 – 12 August 1944) was an Australian politician.

He was born in Oatlands in Tasmania. In 1931 he was elected to the Tasmanian House of Assembly as a Nationalist member for Wilmot. He held the seat until his defeat in 1934. Burbury died in Hobart in 1944.

References

1865 births
1944 deaths
Nationalist Party of Australia members of the Parliament of Tasmania
Members of the Tasmanian House of Assembly